Merrily Weisbord is a Canadian literary non-fiction writer, documentary screenwriter and broadcaster. Her 2010 book The Love Queen of Malabar, a memoir of her longtime friendship with the late Indian writer Kamala Das, was a finalist for the 2010 Hilary Weston Writers' Trust Prize for Nonfiction, the QWF Mavis Gallant Prize for Non-fiction, and the Charles Taylor Prize for Literary Non-Fiction. Her other books include Dogs with Jobs, The Valour and the Horror (coauthored with Merilyn Simonds), Our Future Selves: Love, Life, Sex and Aging and The Strangest Dream.

Career
Weisbord lives in Montreal and the Laurentian mountains. She was a CBC Radio broadcaster before writing The Strangest Dream: Canadian Communists, the Spy Trials and the Cold War. She co-authored The Valour and the Horror: The Untold Story of Canadians in the Second World War, which was six weeks on Maclean's best-seller list. She also authored Our Future Selves: Love, Life, Sex and Aging, published in Canada, the US, French Canada, and Japan. She co-created the hit TV series Dogs with Jobs, which sold in 57 countries worldwide, and she wrote the documentary Deconstructing Supper, finalist for the Writers Guild of Canada Top Ten Awards. She wrote and co-directed Ted Allan: Minstrel Boy of the Twentieth Century, winner of the Chris Award for social documentary.

Weisbord is a founding member of the Quebec Writers Federation, served on the National Council of the Writers' Union of Canada and the CBC Short Story Competition jury, Canada Council Non-Fiction and Public Reading juries, and the Hilary Weston Non-Fiction jury. She is currently coordinator of the QWF Workshop Committee.

As a teacher, Weisbord was distinguished visiting professor at the Honors Center at SUNY Plattsburgh, has taught creative writing and documentary film at McGill University and Concordia University and was Concordia's first literary non-fiction writer-in-residence. She is based in Montreal, Quebec.

Books 
The Strangest Dream: Canadian Communists, the Spy Trials and the Cold War (1983)
Our Future Selves: Love, Life, Sex and Aging (1991)
The Valour and the Horror: the Untold Story of Canadians in the Second World War (co-written with Merilyn Simonds, 1991)
The Love Queen of Malabar: Memoir of a Friendship with Kamala Das (2010, McGill-Queens University Press)
Dogs with Jobs: Working Dogs Around the World (co-written with Kim Kachanoff, 2000)

Film and television 
 Writer/co-director: Ted Allan: Minstrel Boy of the Twentieth Century
 Writer: Deconstructing Supper
 Creator: Dogs with Jobs
 Writer: Prostate Cancer: The Male Nightmare
 Writer: Once in August: Margaret Atwood
 Writer: Songololo: Voices of Change

References

External links
Merrily Weisbord Profile on QWF Literary Database of Quebec English-Language Authors

Canadian women non-fiction writers
Writers from Montreal
Living people
Year of birth missing (living people)